Ubiquitin-conjugating enzyme E2 G1 is a protein that in humans is encoded by the UBE2G1 gene.

The modification of proteins with ubiquitin is an important cellular mechanism for targeting abnormal or short-lived proteins for degradation. Ubiquitination involves at least three classes of enzymes: ubiquitin-activating enzymes, or E1s, ubiquitin-conjugating enzymes, or E2s, and ubiquitin-protein ligases, or E3s. This gene encodes a member of the E2 ubiquitin-conjugating enzyme family and catalyzes the covalent attachment of ubiquitin to other proteins. The protein may be involved in degradation of muscle-specific proteins.

References

Further reading